The 1998 Women's Pro Fastpitch season was the second season of professional softball for the Women's Pro Fastpitch (WPF).  The 66-game season was divided into two-halves, with the winner of each half meeting in a championship series.

Teams, cities and stadiums

Milestones and Events
Two WPF teams announced that they would play their games in different stadiums during the 1998 season: the Carolina Diamonds moved  to Sims Legion Park in Gastonia, North Carolina, and the Georgia Pride announced that they would play their home games at South Commons Softball Stadium in Columbus, Georgia.

Changes for 1998 included a revision of the playing rules (43-foot pitching distance, 60-foot base distances), an expanded national television schedule (eight games on ESPN2), and the league's first all-star game, to be played at Firestone Stadium in Akron, Ohio on July 14.

Player Acquisition

College Draft

The 10-round 1998 WPF Draft was held December 6, 1997 in Palm Springs, CA.  Georgia Pride selected pitcher Desarie Knipfer of Cal Poly as the first overall pick.

League standings 

Source:

WPF Championship Series
Sources:

The 1998 WPF Championship Series was held at Sims Legion Park in Gastonia, North Carolina September 4–5.  The winners of each half of the season met in a best-of-three series to determine the champion.

Annual awards
Sources:

WPF All-Star Game

After the completion of the 1997 WPF season, the league circulated a questionnaire to players.  At the suggestion of players on that questionnaire, the league scheduled an All-Star Game for the 1998 season.

The game  was played on July 14 in Akron, OH at Firestone Stadium, televised on July 20 on ESPN2.  The game was contested by a "Stars" team that played a "Stripes" team.  The Stars team included players from the Diamonds, Dragons and Roadsters, while the Stripes were composed of players from the Pride, FireStix and Wahoos.  The Stars beat the Stripes by an 8-1 score, in front of a crowd of 3,873.

Following is an incomplete listing of the All-Star rosters:

References

External links

See also

 List of professional sports leagues
 List of professional sports teams in the United States and Canada

Softball teams
Softball in the United States
Pro Fastpitch season
Soft